The Rioja Province is one of ten provinces of the San Martín Region in northern Peru.

Location
The province is bordered to the north and east by the Moyobamba Province and to the south and west by the Amazonas Region.
The province has a population of 90,000 inhabitants. Its capital is Rioja.

Political division
The province is divided into nine districts.

 Awajun (Bajo Naranjillo)
 Elias Soplin Vargas (Segunda Jerusalén)
 Nueva Cajamarca (Nueva Cajamarca)
 Pardo Miguel (Naranjos)
 Posic (Posic)
 Rioja (Rioja)
 San Fernando (San Fernando)
 Yorongos (Yorongos)
 Yuracyacu (Yuracyacu)

Provinces of the San Martín Region